Mizoram Rural Bank (MRB) is a Regional Rural Bank in Mizoram sponsored by State Bank of India.It is under the ownership of Ministry of Finance , Government of India.

History
It was established on 27 September 1983 under the Regional Rural Bank Act, 1976 and is the only Bank having presence in all districts of Mizoram. Mizoram Rural Bank started using core banking only in February 2011.

Operation
Mizoram Rural bank has 100 branches, covering all the 11 districts and 26 RD blocks. The Bank is headquartered in Aizawl.

See also

 Banking in India
 List of banks in India
 Reserve Bank of India
 Regional Rural Bank
 Indian Financial System Code
 List of largest banks
 List of companies of India
 Make in India

References

External links
 Rural banks at rbi.org.in

Regional rural banks of India
Companies based in Mizoram
1983 establishments in Mizoram
Banks established in 1983